G37, G-37 or G.37 may refer to:

 Infiniti G37, an automobile
 SMS G37, an Imperial German Navy torpedo boat
 Glock 37, a firearm